Nationality words link to articles with information on the nation's poetry or literature (for instance, Irish or France).

Events

Works published
 Anonymous, The Friar and the Boy, publication year uncertain (sometime between 1510–1513); a popular fabliau; Great Britain
 Jean Lemaire de Belges, La Concorde des deux langages, referring to the French and Italian languages, urging cultural unity; Belgian Walloon poet writing in French
 John Lydgate, The Governance of Kings, also known as  translated from Aristotle's secreta secretorum; Lydgate's last work (see also Robert Copland's Secreta secretorum 1528); Great Britain
 Cancionero general, anthology of Spanish poetry, published by Hernando del Castillo (revised several times in the 16th century)

Births
Death years link to the corresponding "[year] in poetry" article:
 November 15 – Joannes Secundus (died 1536), Dutch, Latin-language poet

Deaths
Birth years link to the corresponding "[year] in poetry" article:
Matthias Ringmann (born 1482), German cartographer and humanist poet

See also

 Poetry
 16th century in poetry
 16th century in literature
 French Renaissance literature
 Grands Rhétoriqueurs
 Renaissance literature
 Spanish Renaissance literature

Notes

16th-century poetry
Poetry